The One Mighty and Strong is the subject of an 1832 prophecy by Joseph Smith, the founder of the Latter Day Saint movement. The prophecy echoes and parallels the words and prophecies contained in Isaiah 28:2 and Isaiah 11:11;  2 Nephi 3:21-25. The One Mighty and Strong was said by Smith to be one who would "set in order the house of God" and arrange for the "inheritances of the [Latter Day] Saints." Since the prophecy was proclaimed, many Latter Day Saints have claimed to be or to have otherwise identified the One Mighty and Strong. Some schismatic Latter Day Saint sects have arisen as a result of such claims.

Smith's prophecy
In a letter written to William W. Phelps on November 27, 1832, Joseph Smith transcribed a revelation that he said he received from Jesus Christ:

[I]t shall come to pass, that I, the Lord God, will send one mighty and strong, holding the sceptre of power in his hand, clothed with light for a covering, whose mouth shall utter words, eternal words; while his bowels shall be a fountain of truth, to set in order the house of God, and to arrange by lot the inheritances of the Saints, whose names are found, and the names of their fathers, and of their children enrolled in the book of the law of God: while that man, who was called of God and appointed, that putteth forth his hand to steady the ark of God, shall fall by the vivid shaft of lightning.... These things I say not of myself; therefore, as the Lord speaketh, He will also fulfill.See also reprint in Joseph Smith (B.H. Roberts ed.) (1902). History of the Church 1:297–99.

Smith never publicly revealed the identity of the "One Mighty and Strong" referred to in this prophecy.

In a letter to Brigham Young, dated May 6, 1867, Phelps mentioned that he believed that Smith's prophecy refers to Adam and his future arrival at Adam-ondi-Ahman.

Canonization by The Church of Jesus Christ of Latter-day Saints
The first Latter Day Saint denomination to canonize Smith's prophecy was the Church of Jesus Christ of Latter-day Saints (LDS Church). In 1876, the excerpt from the Smith–Phelps letter was included as Section 85 in the church's edition of the Doctrine and Covenants, a work of sacred canon for believers in the faiths scripture. The section continues to be found in the modern LDS Church's scripture. Since its canonization, members of the LDS Church and its splinter groups have been the primary groups of Latter Day Saints who have made claims of identifying the "one mighty and strong." However, some from Latter Day Saint denominations that have not canonized Smith's prophecy have also made similar identifications.

Interpretations
In a 1905 statement, the First Presidency of the LDS Church—composed of Joseph F. Smith, John R. Winder, and Anthon H. Lund—offered two possible interpretations of the prophecy.

Closed prophecy
First, the Presidency stated that Smith's words may have been a prophecy of what would happen if the presiding bishop of the church, Edward Partridge, failed to repent and fulfill his calling in the church:

It is to be observed first of all that the subject of this whole letter, as also the part of it subsequently accepted as a revelation, relates to the affairs of the Church in Missouri, the gathering of the Saints to that land and obtaining their inheritances under the law of consecration and stewardship; and the Prophet [Joseph Smith] deals especially with the matter of what is to become of those who fail to receive their inheritances by order or deed from the bishop. ...

It was while these conditions of rebellion, jealousy, pride, unbelief and hardness of heart prevailed among the brethren in Zion—Jackson county, Missouri—in all of which Bishop Partridge participated, that the words of the revelation taken from the letter to William W. Phelps, of the 27th of November, 1832, were written. The "man who was called and appointed of God" to "divide unto the Saints their inheritance"—Edward Partridge—was at that time out of order, neglecting his own duty, and putting "forth his hand to steady the ark"; hence, he was warned of the judgment of God impending, and the prediction was made that another, "one mighty and strong," would be sent of God to take his place, to have his bishopric—one having the spirit and power of that high office resting upon him, by which he would have power to "set in order the house of God, and arrange by lot the inheritance of the Saints"; in other words, one who would do the work that Bishop Edward Partridge had been appointed to do, but had failed to accomplish. ...

And inasmuch as through his repentance and sacrifices and suffering, Bishop Edward Partridge undoubtedly obtained a mitigation of the threatened judgment against him of falling "by the shaft of death, like as a tree that is smitten by the vivid shaft of lightning," so the occasion for sending another to fill his station—"one mighty and strong to set in order the house of God, and to arrange by lot the inheritances of the Saints"—may also be considered as having passed away and the whole incident of the prophecy closed.

Prophecy of a future presiding bishop
However, the First Presidency also offered the possibility that the prophecy was not closed, and that the One Mighty and Strong would be a future presiding bishop of the church when the Latter-day Saints return to Jackson County, Missouri. Concerning this possibility, the First Presidency stated:

If, however, there are those who will still insist that the prophecy concerning the coming of "one mighty and strong" is still to be regarded as relating to the future, let the Latter-day Saints know that he will be a future bishop of the Church who will be with the Saints in Zion, Jackson county, Missouri, when the Lord shall establish them in that land; and he will be so blessed with the spirit and power of his calling that he will be able to set in order the house of God, pertaining to the department of the work under his jurisdiction; and in righteousness and justice will "arrange by lot the inheritances of the Saints." He will hold the same high and exalted station that Edward Partridge held; for the latter was called to do just this kind of work—that is, to set in order the house of God pertaining to settling the Saints upon their inheritances.

Contemporary interpretation in the LDS Church
Curriculum material published by the LDS Church for use in the Church Educational System favors the first of the 1905 First Presidency interpretations. In fact, the curriculum does not present the text of the First Presidency's proposed second possibility.

Claimants to the One Mighty and Strong
Since the end of the 19th century, a number of individuals have proposed a third interpretation of the prophecy: that Smith predicted the coming of "One Mighty and Strong" and that such a person has been identified. Often, those who claim to have discovered the identity of the One Mighty and Strong identify themselves as the fulfillment of the prophecy.

That interpretation assumes a much broader role of the One Mighty and Strong, extending throughout the church and beyond the confines of Jackson County, Missouri. Such individuals generally have alleged that the LDS Church is "out of order" and that the One Mighty and Strong has been sent to set it in order, as prophesied by Smith.

The following chart includes individuals who have claimed to have identified the One Mighty and Strong:

Chart of claimed identifications

Notes

References
Bill Shepard, "'To Set in Order the House of God': The Search for the Elusive 'One Mighty and Strong'", Dialogue: A Journal of Mormon Thought, 39(3): 18–45 (Fall 2006).

Doctrine and Covenants
Latter Day Saint terms
Prophecy in Mormonism